This article describes the group stage of the 2021–22 LEN Champions League.

Format
16 teams were drawn into two groups of eight teams. Teams play against each other home-and-away in a round-robin format. The matchdays are from 26 October 2021 to 15 June 2022.

Group A

Matchday 1

Olympiacos v Dinamo Tbilisi

Zodiac CNA Barceloneta v Jadran Split

Novi Beograd v Radnički Kragujevac

AN Brescia v FTC Telekom

Matchday 2

Jadran Split v Dinamo Tbilisi

Novi Beograd v Olympiacos

AN Brescia v Zodiac CNA Barceloneta

Radnički Kragujevac v FTC Telekom

Matchday 3

Dinamo Tbilisi v Zodiac CNA Barceloneta

FTC Telekom v Olympiacos

Jadran Split v Novi Beograd

Radnički Kragujevac v AN Brescia

Matchday 4

Dinamo Tbilisi v AN Brescia

Olympiacos v Zodiac CNA Barceloneta

Jadran Split v Radnički Kragujevac

FTC Telekom v Novi Beograd

Matchday 5

Olympiacos v Jadran Split

Zodiac CNA Barceloneta v FTC Telekom

Novi Beograd v AN Brescia

Radnički Kragujevac v Dinamo Tbilisi

Matchday 6

Zodiac CNA Barceloneta v Radnički Kragujevac

FTC Telekom v Jadran Split

AN Brescia v Olympiacos

Dinamo Tbilisi v Novi Beograd

Matchday 7

Olympiacos v Radnički Kragujevac

Dinamo Tbilisi v FTC Telekom

Zodiac CNA Barceloneta v Novi Beograd

AN Brescia v Jadran Split

Matchday 8

FTC Telekom v Dinamo Tbilisi

Jadran Split v AN Brescia

Novi Beograd v Zodiac CNA Barceloneta

Radnički Kragujevac v Olympiacos

Matchday 9

Olympiacos v AN Brescia

Radnički Kragujevac v Zodiac CNA Barceloneta

Jadran Split v FTC Telekom

Novi Beograd v Dinamo Tbilisi

Matchday 10

Dinamo Tbilisi v Radnički Kragujevac

Jadran Split v Olympiacos

FTC Telekom v Zodiac CNA Barceloneta

AN Brescia v Novi Beograd

Matchday 11

Zodiac CNA Barceloneta v Olympiacos

Novi Beograd v FTC Telekom

AN Brescia v Dinamo Tbilisi

Radnički Kragujevac v Jadran Split

Matchday 12

Novi Beograd v Jadran Split

Zodiac CNA Barceloneta v Dinamo Tbilisi

Olympiacos v FTC Telekom

Radnički Kragujevac v AN Brescia

Matchday 13

Olympiacos v Novi Beograd

Dinamo Tbilisi v Jadran Split

FTC Telekom v Radnički Kragujevac

Zodiac CNA Barceloneta v AN Brescia

Matchday 14

Dinamo Tbilisi v Olympiacos

Jadran Split v Zodiac CNA Barceloneta

FTC Telekom v AN Brescia

Radnički Kragujevac v Novi Beograd

Group B

Matchday 1

CN Marseille v Pro Recco

Jug AO Dubrovnik v Waspo 98 Hannover

OSC Budapest v Steaua București

Crvena zvezda v Spandau 04

Matchday 2

Jug AO Dubrovnik v CN Marseille

Spandau 04 v Waspo 98 Hannover

Crvena zvezda v OSC Budapest

Pro Recco v Steaua București

Matchday 3

Waspo 98 Hannover v OSC Budapest

Spandau 04 v Jug AO Dubrovnik

Steaua București v CN Marseille

Pro Recco v Crvena zvezda

Matchday 4

OSC Budapest v CN Marseille

Steaua București v Jug AO Dubrovnik

Crvena zvezda v Waspo 98 Hannover

Pro Recco v Spandau 04

Matchday 5

CN Marseille v Waspo 98 Hannover

Spandau 04 v Steaua București

OSC Budapest v Pro Recco

Crvena zvezda v Jug AO Dubrovnik

Matchday 6

CN Marseille v Spandau 04

Waspo 98 Hannover v Pro Recco

Jug AO Dubrovnik v OSC Budapest

Steaua București v Crvena zvezda

Matchday 7

Jug AO Dubrovnik v Pro Recco

Steaua București v Waspo 98 Hannover

OSC Budapest v Spandau 04

CN Marseille v Crvena zvezda

Matchday 8

Waspo 98 Hannover v Steaua București

Spandau 04 v OSC Budapest

Crvena zvezda v CN Marseille

Pro Recco v Jug AO Dubrovnik

Matchday 9

Spandau 04 v CN Marseille

OSC Budapest v Jug AO Dubrovnik

Crvena zvezda v Steaua București

Pro Recco v Waspo 98 Hannover

Matchday 10

Waspo 98 Hannover v CN Marseille

Jug AO Dubrovnik v Crvena zvezda

Steaua București v Spandau 04

Pro Recco v OSC Budapest

Matchday 11

Waspo 98 Hannover v Crvena zvezda

CN Marseille v OSC Budapest

Jug AO Dubrovnik v Steaua București

Spandau 04 v Pro Recco

Matchday 12

Jug AO Dubrovnik v Spandau 04

CN Marseille v Steaua București

OSC Budapest v Waspo 98 Hannover

Crvena zvezda v Pro Recco

Matchday 13

OSC Budapest v Crvena zvezda

Steaua București v Pro Recco

CN Marseille v Jug AO Dubrovnik

Waspo 98 Hannover v Spandau 04

Matchday 14

Waspo 98 Hannover v Jug AO Dubrovnik

Pro Recco v CN Marseille

Spandau 04 v Crvena zvezda

Steaua București v OSC Budapest

References

External links
, len.microplustiming.com

Preliminary Round